Tettigonia is the type genus of bush crickets belonging to the subfamily Tettigoniinae. The scientific name Tettigonia is onomatopoeic and derives from the Greek τεττιξ, meaning cicada.

Species of this genus are typically quite large insects, with relatively massive bodies, green or brownish colour and long hindlegs. For example, great green bush-crickets, the type species described by Carl Linnaeus in his landmark 1758 10th edition of Systema Naturae, are the largest Orthopterans in the British Isles.

Most Tettigonia species are present in Europe, North Africa and the Asian mainland, apart from Tettigonia orientalis which occurs in Japan.

Species
The Orthoptera Species File lists:

 Tettigonia armeniaca Tarbinsky, 1940 (synonyms T. acutipennis Ebner, 1946; T. turcica Ramme, 1951)
 Tettigonia balcanica Chobanov & Lemonnier-Darcemont, 2014
 Tettigonia cantans (Fuessly, 1775)
 Tettigonia caudata (Charpentier, 1842)
 Tettigonia chinensis Willemse, 1933
 Tettigonia chitralensis Sultana, Panhwar & Wagan, 2015
 Tettigonia dolichoptera Mori, 1933
 Tettigonia hispanica Bolívar, 1893
 Tettigonia ibuki Furukawa, 1938
 Tettigonia jungi Storozhenko, Kim & Jeon, 2015
 Tettigonia krugeri Massa, 1998
 Tettigonia longealata Chopard, 1937
 Tettigonia longispina Ingrisch, 1983
 Tettigonia lozanoi (Bolívar, 1914)
 Tettigonia macrocephalus (Fischer von Waldheim, 1846)
 Tettigonia macroxipha (Bolívar, 1914)
 Tettigonia orientalis Uvarov, 1924
 Tettigonia savignyi (Lucas, 1849)
 Tettigonia silana Capra, 1936
 Tettigonia tsushimensis Ogawa, 2003
 Tettigonia ussuriana Uvarov, 1939
 Tettigonia uvarovi Ebner, 1946
 Tettigonia vaucheriana (Pictet, 1888)
 Tettigonia viridissima (Linnaeus, 1758) - type species (as Gryllus viridissimus L.)
 Tettigonia yama Furukawa, 1938

Gallery

References

Tettigoniinae
Tettigoniidae genera